K'alemi Dene School is a public school located in N'Dilo, Northwest Territories. It serves grades K-10 and is a part of the Yellowknife Education District No. 1.

Education in Yellowknife
Middle schools in the Northwest Territories
Elementary schools in the Northwest Territories